The Mexican National Championship of Badminton is a nationwide competition of badminton held in Mexico since 1933. This tournament was initially organised by the then "Asociación Mexicana de Badminton", together with the Centro Deportivo Chapultepec AC.

Since its beginning, the best Mexican players have competed in the Mexican National Championship of Badminton.

Traditionally, the tournament has been organised in five events or categories, namely, men's singles, women's singles, men's doubles, women's doubles, and mixed doubles.

Along with the Mexican National Championship of Badminton, another badminton competition has been held in Mexico called the Mexican National Open Championship of Badminton which main difference is that foreign badminton players can also participate in it. The original intention was that both tournaments would be held annually; however, due to different circumstances this has not always been the case.

Mexico is the Latin American country with the oldest tradition in badminton and this tournament is among the oldest competitions from the region.

Winners

References 

Badminton tournaments in Mexico